Kai oi Pantremenoi Ehoun Psihi is a Greek television series that was aired by ANT1 for three seasons, in period 1997–2000. It was written by Lefteris Kaponis and was directed by Antonis Tempos. The series stars Antonis Kafetzopoulos and Giorgos Partsalakis. It has high viewership and was existed television success of that period. In 2013, the series was adapted for a cinema film with the name Akalyptos.

Plot
The series follows the life of two married friends, Makis and Andreas. Andreas loves the rich life and the women but he is all the time broke and he borrows money from his friend and other people. In exchange, he covers his friend Makis who has an extramarital relationship. Because Andreas never pays his debts, he has got the cognomen Akalyptos.

Cast
Antonis Kafetzopoulos
Yorgos Partsalakis 
Maria Tsombanaki 
Renia Louizidou
Konstadina Mihael 
Aspasia Tzitzikaki 
Maria Papalambrou 
Alexandros Koliopoulos
Karmen Rouggeri

References

External links

ANT1 original programming
1997 Greek television series debuts
2000 Greek television series endings
1990s Greek television series
Greek-language television shows
Greek comedy television series